The Carmichael Show is an American television sitcom broadcast on NBC created by Jerrod Carmichael, Ari Katcher, Willie Hunter and Nicholas Stoller. The series premiered on August 26, 2015. Starring Carmichael, it follows a fictional version of his family. On May 15, 2016, NBC renewed the series for a 13-episode third season, which premiered on May 31, 2017. On June 30, 2017, NBC canceled the series after three seasons.

The Carmichael Show aired 32 episodes over three seasons from August 26, 2015 until August 9, 2017.

Series overview

Episodes

Season 1 (2015)

Season 2 (2016)

Season 3 (2017)

References

Carmichael Show, The